Maytenus silvestris is a shrub or small tree growing from Picton, New South Wales (34° S) near Kroombit Tops, near Gladstone, Queensland (23° S). It occurs in dry rainforest,  eucalyptus and rainforest ecotone areas. Common names include narrow leaved orangebark, orange bush and orange bark.

Description 
Commonly seen as a densely dark green shrub two metres tall, though it can occasionally attain heights of 10 to 15 metres with a trunk diameter of 25 cm thick. The trunk is crooked and misshapen but without buttresses. Outer bark greyish brown or grey, fairly smooth but with lenticels. The other part of live bark is green, brown and reddish. The exposed bark gives the common name, "Orange Bark".

Leaves are 10 to 80 mm long, 2 to 13 mm wide, narrow lanceolate to ovate in shape. Leaf edges are curved over, sometimes with toothed edges, other times entire. Leaf tip sometimes curved. The leaf base slowly tapers away with a thin beginning of the leaf. Leaf stalks 2 to 5 mm long. Leaf venation evident on both sides, 5 to 8 pairs of lateral veins. Leaflets with lenticels, slender and smooth in shape, dark reddish brown or grey. New shoots downy.

Flowers & fruit 
Pale green flowers form on racemes from the leaf axils. Either singly, or in twos or threes. Flowering usually from October to January, though sometimes as late as Easter. The fruit is an orange capsule, roundish in shape. 3 to 7 mm in diameter. The capsule splits in two, with one to four glossy brown seeds, enclosed in an orange fleshy aril. Seeds egg shaped, 4 to 5 mm long. Fruit matures from February to May. Seed germination is quite reliable, with germination complete after 42 days.

References

 
 

Flora of New South Wales
Flora of Queensland
silvestris
Trees of Australia